Gerard Majella (6 April 1726 – 16 October 1755) was an Italian lay brother of the Congregation of the Redeemer, better known as the Redemptorists, who is honored as a saint by the Catholic Church.

His intercession is sought for children, unborn children, women in childbirth, mothers, expectant mothers, motherhood, the falsely accused, good confessions, lay brothers and Muro Lucano, Italy.

Life
Majella was born in Muro Lucano on 6 April 1726, the youngest of five children. He was frail, and his parents had him baptized the day he was born. He was the son of Domenico Maiella, a tailor who died when Gerard was twelve, leaving the family in poverty. His mother, Benedetta Galella, then sent him to her brother so that he could teach Gerard to sew and follow in his father's footsteps. However, the foreman was abusive. The boy kept silent, but his uncle soon found out and the man who taught him resigned from the job. After four years of apprenticeship, he took a job as a servant to work for the local Bishop of Lacedonia. Upon the bishop's death, Gerard returned to his trade, working first as a journeyman and then on his own account. He divided his earnings between his mother and the poor and in offerings for the souls in Purgatory.

He tried to join the Capuchin Order twice, but his health prevented it. In 1749, he joined the Congregation of the Most Holy Redeemer, known as Redemptorists. The order was founded in 1732 by Alphonsus Liguori (1696-1787) at Scala, near Naples. The essentially- missionary order is dedicated to "preaching the word of God to the poor." Its apostolate is principally in giving of missions and retreats.

During his life, he was very close to the peasants and other outsiders who lived in the Neapolitan countryside. In his work with the Redemptorist community, he was variously a gardener, sacristan, tailor, porter, cook, carpenter, and clerk of works on the new buildings at Caposele.

At 27, the Majella was controversially identified by a young pregnant woman as the father of her child.To avoid exposing the man behind the pregnancy, St. Gerard accepted the blame silently. His superior St Alphonse Ligouri questioned him and, due to his silence, banned him from receiving the Holy Communion. After several years the women revealed the truth on her deathbed and testified to St Gerard’s holiness. 

Some of Majella's reported miracles include restoring life to a boy who had fallen from a high cliff, blessing the scant supply of wheat belonging to a poor family and making it last until the next harvest, and several times multiplying the bread that he was distributing to the poor.

One day, he walked across the water to lead a boatload of fishermen through stormy waves to the safety of the shore. He was reputed to have had bilocation and the ability to read souls.

His last will was a small note on the door of his cell: "Here the will of God is done, as God wills, and as long as God wills." He died at 29 of tuberculosis on 16 October 1755 in Materdomini, Italy.

Patron of mothers
One miracle in particular explains how Majella became known as the special patron of mothers. A few months before his death, he visited the Pirofalo family and accidentally dropped his handkerchief. One of the Pirofalo girls spotted the handkerchief moments after he had left the house, and she ran after Gerard to return it. "Keep it," he said to her. "You may need it some day."

Years later when the girl, now a married woman, was on the verge of dying in childbirth, she remembered the words of the saintly lay brother. She asked for the handkerchief to be brought to her. Almost immediately, the pain disappeared and she gave birth to a healthy child. That was no small feat in an era when only one out of three pregnancies resulted in a live birth, and word of the miracle spread quickly.

Because of the miracles that God worked through Gerard's prayers with mothers, the mothers of Italy took Gerard to their hearts and made him their patron. At the process of his beatification, one witness testified that he was known as "il santo dei felice parti," the saint of happy childbirths.

His devotion has become very popular in North America, both in the United States and Canada.

Veneration

Majella was beatified in Rome on 29 January 1893 by Pope Leo XIII. He was canonized less than twelve years later on 11 December 1904 by Pope Pius X. The feast day of Saint Gerard Majella is October 16.

In 1977, St. Gerard's Chapel in St. Lucy's Church (Newark, New Jersey) was dedicated as a national shrine.  Each year during the Feast days, which include October 16, there are traditional lights, music, food stands and a street procession. People come from all over to celebrate. Devotees also visit the shrine throughout the year to petition the help of St. Gerard.

The St. Gerard Majella Annual Novena takes place every year at St. Josephs Church in Dundalk, Ireland. This annual nine-day novena is the biggest festival of faith in Ireland. St. Joseph's sponsors the St. Gerard's Family League, an association of Christians united in prayer for their own and other families, to preserve Christian values in their home and family lives.

Legacy

St Gerard's Church in Wellington, New Zealand, built in 1908, was the first church to be dedicated to him. Other churches dedicated to him are located in: Sapugahawatte, Dodangoda, Sri Lanka; Kirimatiyana, Lunuwila, Sri Lanka; Preston, Lancashire, England; Bristol, England; and Westminster, Western Australia.

Catholic parishes dedicated to him are located in Hollis (in the Borough of Queens), New York City; Kirkwood, Missouri; Port Jefferson Station, Long Island, Brooklyn Park, Minnesota, New York; and Del Rey, Los Angeles, California.

The Sanctuary of San Gerardo Maiella is a basilica in Materdomini, Italy dedicated to him.

The Senior Coroner for Liverpool and Wirral sits at the Gerard Majella Courthouse in Liverpool.

In Scotland, there is a church and primary school dedicated to St Gerard Majella in Bellshill, Lanarkshire, opened in 1971 & 1973 respectively. The maternity hospital, now a housing estate, was located close by, hence the choice of name of church and school.

Two towns in Quebec, Canada, are named in his honour: one in the Montérégie region and another in the Lanaudière region. Another town, St-Jean-Sur-Richelieu, has one of its parishes named after him.

In Ghent (Belgium) a model school was named after Saint Gerard. This school was exhibited on the world exhibition of 1913 in Ghent as a model for Belgium's future school buildings. In 1914 it was rebuilt after the exhibition with the same stones. Nowadays the Saint Gerard School is used by a charity organisation "Geraarke" (local name) which supports poor people with clothes and food packages.
In Nigeria, there is a shrine dedicated to St Gerard Majella at a place called Oba, in Anambra State. It was given to the Redemptorists of the Vice-Province of Nigeria by the Archbishop of Onitsha, Most Rev. Valerian Okeke. The Redemeptorists also built a school for the poor and most abandoned in the shrine site dedicated to St Gerard Majella.

He was featured on an Italian 45-eurocent postage stamp in May 2005.

References

Further reading
Farrelly Jr, Peter, "Hope in the Handkerchief of a Saint"
Rabenstein, Katherine, "For All The Saints"
Karelse, Theun, "The Field Guide To Flying Saints"
Heinegg, Peter (translator), "Saint Gerard Majella, His Writings and Spirituality" -

External links

 "The Mothers' Saint", St. Gerard Majella C.Ss.R.
 Santuario San Gerardo Maiella - Materdomini 
 

1726 births
1755 deaths
People from Muro Lucano
Redemptorists
Redemptorist saints
Italian Roman Catholic saints
Canonized Roman Catholic religious brothers
18th-century Christian saints
Canonizations by Pope Pius X
Beatifications by Pope Leo XIII
Venerated Catholics